The testicular artery (the male gonadal artery, also called the internal spermatic arteries in older texts) is a branch of the abdominal aorta that supplies blood to the testis.  It is a paired artery, with one for each of the testes.

It is the male equivalent of the ovarian artery.  Because the testis is found in a different location than that of its female equivalent, it has a different course than the ovarian artery.

They are two slender vessels of considerable length, and arise from the front of the aorta a little below the renal arteries.

Each passes obliquely downward and lateralward behind the peritoneum, resting on the Psoas major, the right lying in front of the inferior vena cava and behind the middle colic and ileocolic arteries and the terminal part of the ileum, the left behind the left colic and sigmoid arteries and the iliac colon.

Each crosses obliquely over the ureter and the lower part of the external iliac artery to reach the abdominal inguinal ring, through which it passes, and accompanies the other constituents of the spermatic cord along the inguinal canal to the scrotum, where it becomes tortuous, and divides into several branches.

Two or three of these accompany the ductus deferens, and supply the epididymis, anastomosing with the artery of the ductus deferens; others pierce the back part of the tunica albuginea, and supply the substance of the testis.

The internal spermatic artery supplies one or two small branches to the ureter, and in the inguinal canal gives one or two twigs to the Cremaster.

Additional images

See also
 Testicular vein
 Ovarian vein

References

External links
  - "Layers of the Spermatic Cord"
 

Arteries of the abdomen
Art